[[Image:TV-icon-2.svg|thumb|110px| Official Video]'']]

The men's 4 × 400 metres relay''' competition at the 2016 Summer Olympics in Rio de Janeiro, Brazil was held at the Estádio Olímpico João Havelange on 19–20 August.

Summary
The Bahamas entered as the defending Olympic champions while United States had won both the 2013 and 2015 World Championships since then. Louisiana State University held the world leading time of 3:00.38 minutes prior to the event.  The American college team was anchored by Fitzroy Dunkley who ran for Jamaica here. Trinidad and Tobago, medallists at both the last Olympics and World Championships, were the next strongest team. Other teams entering with fast quartets were Jamaica, Great Britain and  2016 European champions Belgium.

As in 2012, the heats produced some drama.  During the first handoff, in lanes, Trinidad and Tobago leadoff leg, Jarrin Solomon stepped inside of the lane line.  He had already let go of the baton to Lalonde Gordon but the team was disqualified. In the second semi-final both Great Britain and India were disqualified for starting their leg with a foot outside of the passing zone.

The final began with Botswana's Isaac Makwala, the seventh fastest man in history and Jamaica's Peter Matthews taking it out hard.  Matthews had passed Belgium's Julien Watrin at the head of the stretch, but Watrin pulled it back as Matthews slowed.  Botswana made the handoff first.  USA's Arman Hall also pulled back some ground from Matthews as USA exchanged even with Jamaica.  Tony McQuay ran the turn hard to get the jump on Botswana's fifth place open sprinter, 18 year old Karabo Sibanda at the break.  Michael Mathieu also put Bahamas ahead of Jamaica's Nathon Allen who was in a battle with Jonathan Borlée, the first of three successive Borlée brothers for Belgium.

Coming off the turn, Sibanda put the move on McQuay, putting Botswana into the lead,  5 metres back, Allen put the same move on Mathieu to put Jamaica into third.  Because USA had the lead at the half way mark of the lap, Sibanda had to move back out to lane 2 to find his teammate Onkabetse Nkobolo.  McQuay used the opening to move back even with Sibanda.  After receiving the handoff Nkobolo ran into the back of American Gil Roberts who was still in the process of receiving the baton, Nkobolo lost all forward momentum and Roberts gained the edge coming out of the handoff.  A meter down, Nkobolo stuck behind Roberts as if there was a rope between them.  Behind them, Jamaica's Fitzroy Dunkley was closing the gap.  Coming off the turn, unimpeded, Roberts stumbled and lost his balance, throwing his baton hand high in the air to right himself and avert a disaster by stepping inside of the curb.  Dunkley slowed down the stretch, Steven Gardiner pulling Bahamas back even.

The final handoff, Roberts to bronze medalist LaShawn Merritt, Botswana to Leaname Maotoanong was clean.  Bahamas' "Fireman" Chris Brown gained the edge over Jamaica's Javon Francis on their handoff three metres up on the Borlée brothers.  Down the backstretch and into the final turn, Maotoanong stayed consistently about 2 metres behind Merritt as Brown, Francis and Kevin Borlée crept closer.  Francis went for the pass during the turn but Brown held him off to the straightaway.  Merritt began to pull away from Maotoanong.  Running in lane 2, Francis got past Brown then squeezed him out of running space as he passed Maotoanong.  Brown had to move into lane 2.  Getting passed, Maotoanong began to struggle, flailing his arms but running backward.  Brown went by on the outside, Borlée went by on the inside.  Merritt crossed the finish line seven metres up on Francis to give America gold over Jamaica's silver.  Three more metres back, Borlée was making a mighty rush at Brown, dipping and diving too late to get the bronze as Bahamas held on while Borlée crashed to the track.

Belgium and Botswana both set national records in the heats and finals.  McQuay's leg was timed as 43.2, tied for the fourth fastest relay splits in history.

The medals for the competition were presented by Angela Ruggiero, IOC member, and the gifts were presented by Alberto Juantorena, IAAF Council Member.

Records
Prior to the competition, the existing World and Olympic records were as follows.

The following records were established during the competition:

The following national records were established during the competition:

Schedule
All times are Brazil time (UTC−3)

Results

Heats
Qualification rule: first 3 of each heat (Q) plus the 2 fastest times (q) qualified.

Heat 1

Heat 2

Final

References

Men's 4 x 400 metres relay
Relay foot races at the Olympics
Olympics 2016
Men's events at the 2016 Summer Olympics